The World Polo Championship 2015, tenth edition, took place in Santiago, Chile during March and April 2015 and was won by the host, beating the United States in the final.

This event brought together six teams from around the world in the Club de Polo y Equitación San Cristóbal of the Chilean capital.

Fixture and Results
Pool Results
 P. Round
 Results

Knockout stages

External links
 Mundialdepolo.cl
 Federation of International Polo
 Chilean Federation of Polo

2015
Polo competitions in Chile
Sport in Santiago
World Polo Championship, 2015